Provence Power Station or Gardanne Power Station is an 868 MW coal-fired power station at Gardanne, France. It has a 297 meter tall chimney, which is the tallest in France. It is owned and operated by Uniper.
It is going to be backfitted into a wood-fired powerstation.

See also 

 List of tallest structures in France
 List of power stations in France

References

Coal-fired power stations in France
Chimneys in France